An MP4 watch is a small portable video and music flash-based media player which can be worn on the wrist like a wristwatch. (See MP4 Player for the origin of the 'MP4' moniker.) Most devices are actually functional digital watches as well as being media players. Users can watch video on the LED or OLED color screen and listen to the audio played back over small built-in speakers, earphones, or a wireless headset in the case of Bluetooth MP4 watches.

MP4 watches typically require the user to convert video files to smaller resolution or particular file formats before they can be played back. This led to the development of "MP5" watches that could play all the popular video file formats natively.

MP4 watches are also known as "video watches", "MP4 player watches", and "watch MP4 players".

Development
The first commercially available MP4 watch available to consumers in America was one manufactured by the Chinese electronics manufacturer Shenzhen Adragon Digitek in September 2006  and the now discontinued Aigo F209. Gadget blogs have tracked the evolution of MP4 Watches from the large and unwieldy through successive design improvements making them more realistically "wearable" gadgets.

Like standard MP4 Players, MP4 watches are most commonly manufactured in Mainland China. While the form factor has yet to be picked up by well-known brands, a number of original equipment manufacturers currently offer MP4 watches with a wide range of styles. There are indications that well-known consumer electronics brands will not sell MP4 watches, instead moving straight to cellphone watches, which incorporate video functions and arguably supersede the MP4 watch concept.

Function and  design
MP4 watches are traditionally square by design and can have metal, plastic or leather straps. Screen size varies between 1 and 2 inches including some in "widescreen" dimensions.

While MP4 watches are principally marketed as ultra-portable video and timekeeping devices, watches today may also include functions such as:
Digital camera capture and video camera recording
Text file readout
MP3 player
Video games
Audio recorder functions
File storage and file transfer

Notes

Consumer electronics